Maxime Renault (born 2 January 1990) is a French cyclist, who currently rides for French amateur team WB–Fybolia Locminé.

Major results

2010
 1st Stage 2 Mi-Août en Bretagne
2011
 4th Overall Kreiz Breizh Elites
2012
 3rd Road race, National Under-23 Road Championships
 3rd Paris–Tours Espoirs
2015
 6th Tour du Finistère
 6th Classic Loire Atlantique
 6th Paris–Camembert
 8th Grand Prix La Marseillaise
2016
 9th Tour du Finistère

References

External links

1990 births
Living people
French male cyclists